Inclined is a 2000 site-specific artwork by David Phelps, installed in Oklahoma City's Bricktown neighborhood, in the U.S. state of Oklahoma.

Description
The sculpture is made of bronze, steel, and cement. The Oklahoman Steve Lackmeyer said the artwork "features the upper half torso of a dark-skinned man, double life size, pushing a big concrete sphere up a pair of rails", and has a title with multiple meanings, a characteristic "representative of Phelps' work". Health care consultant Curtis Thomas served as a model for the piece.

Reception
According to The Oklahoman, "Early on, critics questioned whether a sculpture portraying the upper torso of a dark-skinned man pushing a giant sphere up a pair of rails was appropriate for the thriving entertainment district." Multiple members of the Metropolitan Area Projects Citizens Oversight Board's Construction Review Committee felt the sculpture "over-emphasized the civil rights struggle and ignored other historical aspects of Bricktown".

See also

 2000 in art

References

2000 establishments in Oklahoma
2000 sculptures
Black people in art
Bricktown, Oklahoma City
Bronze sculptures in Oklahoma
Outdoor sculptures in Oklahoma City
Sculptures of men in Oklahoma